Maxat Mukhtarovich Ayazbayev (born January 27, 1992, in Baktybai) is a Kazakh former road cyclist, who currently works as a directeur sportif for UCI Continental team .

Major results
2010
 1st Overall Giro della Lunigiana
1st Stage 1
 2nd Road race, Asian Junior Road Championships
 5th Overall Tour du Pays de Vaud
2012
 1st Overall Tour of Bulgaria
1st  Young rider classification
2013
 1st Trofeo Internazionale Bastianelli
 6th Gran Premio Sportivi di Poggiana
 7th Overall Coupe des nations Ville Saguenay
2014
 1st  Young rider classification Vuelta Independencia Nacional
 2nd Overall Vuelta Mexico Telmex
 3rd Road race, Asian Under-23 Road Championships

References

External links

1992 births
Living people
Kazakhstani male cyclists
20th-century Kazakhstani people
21st-century Kazakhstani people